Bart Beks (born 4 July 1973) is a retired Dutch professional tennis player.

Beks reached a career-high ATP singles ranking of World No. 595 achieved on 15 November 2004. He also had a career high ATP doubles ranking of World No. 174 achieved on 8 August 2005.

Beks made his ATP Tour main draw debut in doubles at the 2006 Ordina Open held on grass courts in 's-Hertogenbosch, Netherlands. Partnering up with compatriot Martijn van Haasteren, the pair received a wild-card entry into the main doubles draw. They were defeated in the first round by French duo Florent Serra and Julien Benneteau in straight sets 2–6, 6–7(7–9). Again with van Haasteren, the pair received a direct entry into the 2007 Swedish Open main doubles draw, but also lost in the first round to Swedish pair Robin Söderling and Johan Brunström 3–6, 2–6.

Beks reached two career singles finals with a record of 0 wins and 2 losses both occurring on the ITF Futures circuit on clay courts. Additionally, he has reached 25 career doubles finals, with a record of 11 wins and 14 losses which includes a 1–5 record in ATP Challenger finals. In 2007 he won the Chiasso Challenger doubles title with Matwe Middelkoop defeating Romanians Teodor-Dacian Craciun and Victor Crivoi 7–6(7–2), 7–5 in the final match to claim his first and what would become the only ATP Challenger title of his career.

ATP Challenger and ITF Futures finals

Singles: 2 (0–2)

Doubles: 25 (11–14)

References

External links
 
 

1973 births
Living people
Dutch male tennis players